Laura Ruderman (born November 8, 1970) is a former Washington State Representative for Washington's 45th legislative district. She is a member of the Democratic Party. Ruderman graduated from Wesleyan University in Middletown, Connecticut.

Personal life 
Laura Ruderman's stepson, Jacob B. Greenburg, was arrested and charged with arson and reckless burning during the Seattle riots in September 2020. Laura Ruderman appeared in court on September 29 to vouch for her stepson. After being released on bail Jacob B. Greenburg was arrested again on October 16, 2020 for assaulting a police officer. Video of Greenburg's assault with a metal baseball bat swung at the head of a Seattle Police Department bike officer was widely shared during the riots in Seattle in 2020.

Early legislative work
Laura Ruderman represented the 45th Legislative District in Washington State from 1999 to 2005.

While in office, Ruderman was vice-chair of the Technology, Telecommunications, and Energy Committee, and served on the Health Care, Appropriations, and Rules Committees. In addition to these assignments, she was a member of the K-20 Education Network, the Information Services Board, and the Governor's Task Force on Virtual Learning. Ruderman was elected by her colleagues to be the vice-chair of the House Democratic Caucus.

Ruderman was named one of "100 to Watch" by the Democratic Leadership Council, 2003

Laura Ruderman did not seek re-election in 2004, running instead for Washington State Secretary of State against incumbent Republican Sam Reed; she captured 45% of the vote to Sam Reed's 51%.

Current activities
Since January 2019, Ruderman is CEO of the Technology Alliance 
Since 2005 Ruderman has worked as a school and community activist and a businesswoman.

She is or has been active in the following organizations:
 RESULTS, a nonprofit organization dedicated to improving the lives of impoverished families through legislative action
 Washington Community Alliance for Self-Help (CASH), a non-profit organization that provides low-income women with credit, business training, and peer support
 K-20 Educational Network
 Digital Learning Commons
 King County Library System Foundation
 Sound Mental Health
 21 Acres

Ruderman has been a member of the Redmond Chapter of Business and Professional Women, and in 2010 was co-chair at Discovery Community School in the Lake Washington School District.

2012 congressional candidacy
A June 2011 letter to her supporters says, in part:
... Starting today, I am taking on a new challenge: I am running for a seat in the United States Congress from Washington State in 2012. I am running to serve as a common-sense, effective voice for suburban families like yours and mine, and to help fix the outrageous mess in Washington, DC. I would be proud to be the next Democratic Representative from Washington State in Congress.

References

External links
 Laura Ruderman 2012 Congressional Campaign Page

Living people
Wesleyan University alumni
Democratic Party members of the Washington House of Representatives
Women in Washington (state) politics
1970 births
21st-century American women
Women state legislators in Washington (state)